(born July 1, 1940 – March 31, 2022) was a Japanese actor.

Filmography

Film

Television

References

External links

1940 births
2022 deaths
Japanese male actors
People from Ibaraki, Osaka